"Billy Liar" is the debut single by the Decemberists. Deriving its title from the English novel Billy Liar, the song also references "Nogood Boyo" of Dylan Thomas' Under Milk Wood and appears to generally talk about a young man's boredom during long summer days. Musically, it has an upbeat, somewhat piano-driven, rather poppy sound.

Track listing
 "Billy Liar" – 4:08
 "Los Angeles, I'm Yours" – 4:17
 "Everything I Try to Do, Nothing Seems to Turn Out Right" – 4:03
 "Sunshine" – 2:23

References

2004 songs
2004 debut singles
The Decemberists songs
Songs written by Colin Meloy